In mathematics, a matrix is conformable if its dimensions are suitable for defining some operation (e.g. addition, multiplication, etc.).

Examples
 If two matrices have the same dimensions (number of rows and number of columns), they are conformable for addition.
 Multiplication of two matrices is defined if and only if the number of columns of the left matrix is the same as the number of rows of the right matrix.
 Since squaring a matrix involves multiplying it by itself a matrix must be  (that is, it must be a square matrix) to be conformable for squaring. Thus for example only a square matrix can be idempotent.
 Only a square matrix is conformable for matrix inversion. However, the Moore–Penrose pseudoinverse and other generalized inverses do not have this requirement.
 Only a square matrix is conformable for matrix exponentiation.

See also
 Linear algebra

References

Linear algebra
Matrices